Longqiu is a town in Gaoyou, Yangzhou, Jiangsu.  , it has two residential communities and eleven villages under its administration.

References

Gaoyou
Township-level divisions of Jiangsu